Horseshoe is an unincorporated community in Jackson County, Arkansas, United States.

References

Unincorporated communities in Jackson County, Arkansas
Unincorporated communities in Arkansas